Chuck Garfien is an anchor/reporter for NBC Sports Chicago. He is the host of White Sox Pregame and Postgame Live with Ozzie Guillen, Frank Thomas and other former White Sox players.  Since joining NBC Sports Chicago in 2004, Garfien has won 6 Chicago/Midwest Emmy awards for feature stories on Chicago sports.

Along with his on-air work and writing for nbcsportschicago.com, Garfien hosts the White Sox Talk Podcast, featuring interviews, news and discussions regarding the club.   The podcast surpassed five million downloads in July 2022.

Prior to joining NBC Sports Chicago, Garfien was an anchor/reporter for Fox Sports Net in Denver. He served a two-year stint with ESPN and was one of the original anchors on ESPNEWS. He was the Sports Director for two years at WWJ-TV/WKBD-TV, the CBS and UPN affiliates in Detroit, and was a sports anchor/reporter for WABC-TV in New York City. Garfien was also a sports anchor/reporter at WHTM-TV in Harrisburg, Pennsylvania and had his first on-air sportscasting job at WPBN-TV in Traverse City, Michigan.

He graduated from USC with a degree in communications and attended Homewood-Flossmoor High School. Garfien's broadcasting career began at Homewood-Flossmoor High School, where he spent 4 years working for WHFH. He was the station manager during his senior year.

References

American reporters and correspondents
Homewood-Flossmoor High School alumni
USC Annenberg School for Communication and Journalism alumni
Year of birth missing (living people)
Living people